Church of St. Nicholas (Serbian: Црква Светог Николе у Челебићима) is a temple of the Serbian Orthodox Church , located in Rijeka, Republika Srpska, Foca Municipality. The temple belongs to the Metropolitanate of Dabar-Bosnia. The temple is dedicated to Saint Nicholas of Myra and was built in 1896.

It is a national monument of Bosnia and Herzegovina.

External links
 

Churches in Bosnia and Herzegovina
1896 establishments in Austria-Hungary